In geometric topology, a branch of mathematics, a Dehn twist is a certain type of self-homeomorphism of a surface (two-dimensional manifold).

Definition

Suppose that c is a simple closed curve in a closed, orientable surface S.  Let A be a tubular neighborhood of c.  Then A is an annulus, homeomorphic to the Cartesian product of a circle and a unit interval I: 

Let f be the map from S to itself which is the identity outside of A and inside A we have

Then f is a Dehn twist about the curve c.  

Dehn twists can also be defined on a non-orientable surface S, provided one starts with a 2-sided simple closed curve c on S.

Example

Consider the torus represented by a fundamental polygon with edges a and b

Let a closed curve be the line along the edge a called .

Given the choice of gluing homeomorphism in the figure, a tubular neighborhood of the curve  will look like a band linked around a doughnut. This neighborhood is homeomorphic to an annulus, say 

in the complex plane.

This self homeomorphism acts on the closed curve along b. In the tubular neighborhood it takes the curve of b once along the curve of a.

A homeomorphism between topological spaces induces a natural isomorphism between their fundamental groups. Therefore one has an automorphism

where [x] are the homotopy classes of the closed curve x in the torus.

Mapping class group

It is a theorem of Max Dehn that maps of this form generate the mapping class group of isotopy classes of orientation-preserving homeomorphisms of any closed, oriented genus- surface.

Lickorish also obtained an analogous result for non-orientable surfaces, which require not only Dehn twists, but also "Y-homeomorphisms."

See also
 Lantern relation

References

 Andrew J. Casson, Steven A Bleiler, Automorphisms of Surfaces After Nielsen and Thurston, Cambridge University Press, 1988. .
 Stephen P. Humphries, "Generators for the mapping class group," in: Topology of low-dimensional manifolds (Proc. Second Sussex Conf., Chelwood Gate, 1977), pp. 44–47, Lecture Notes in Math., 722, Springer, Berlin, 1979. 
 W. B. R. Lickorish, "A representation of orientable combinatorial 3-manifolds." Ann. of Math. (2) 76 1962 531—540. 
 W. B. R. Lickorish, "A finite set of generators for the homotopy group of a 2-manifold", Proc. Cambridge Philos. Soc. 60 (1964),  769–778. 

Geometric topology
Homeomorphisms